The 1991 McNeese State Cowboys football team was an American football team that represented McNeese State University as a member of the Southland Conference (Southland) during the 1991 NCAA Division I-AA football season. In their second year under head coach Bobby Keasler, the team compiled an overall record of 6–4–2, with a mark of 4–1–2 in conference play, and finished as Southland co-champion.

Schedule

Roster

References

McNeese State
McNeese Cowboys football seasons
Southland Conference football champion seasons
McNeese State Cowboys football